Dealer is the second studio album by American rock band Foxing. The album was released on October 30, 2015 through Triple Crown Records.

Background 
The album was recorded from May 11 to June 5, 2015 at Red Room Recordings in Seattle. Parts of the song were also recorded  at Studio Litho in Seattle and also in the band's hometown, St. Louis.

The first single, "The Magdalene", was released as a digital download and for streaming on August 22, 2015. On August 28, Triple Crown Records put the official audio of the song on their YouTube channel. In an interview with NPR, lead singer Conor Murphy described the song about losing his virginity and his perception of it being associated with being raised in the Catholic Church.

On September 25, 2015, Foxing released the second single off the album, "Weave". Writing for The Wall Street Journal, Eric Danton described the song as lush and having a textured feel. In a positive review of the track, Gabriela Tully Claymore, writing for Stereogum described the track as a majestic return for Foxing.

Critical reception 

Dealer was well-received by contemporary music critics. On Metacritic, a review aggregator website, the album received an average score of 76 out of 100, indicating "general favorable reviews".

Ian Cohen, writing for Pitchfork, gave the album a 7.6 out of 10, describing Dealer as "an artistic triumph". Cohen further said that he felt Dealer was a better album than their debut album, The Albatross, saying that Dealer is "a significant advance from The Albatross, it's even heavier, more compositionally complex, and more personally revealing than its predecessor." In a rave review by the staff of AbsolutePunk there was consensus that the album would be a hallmark of emo revival comparing it to Harmlessness by The World Is A Beautiful Place And I Am No Longer Afraid To Die. The staff stated that Foxing "have set a new standard with Dealer not just for emo, but for indie and alternative rock across the board."

In a more mixed review, Tom Shepherd, writing for Kerrang!, gave the album three stars out of five.

Track listing

Personnel 

Foxing
 Josh Coll — Group Member
 Jon Hellwig — Group Member
 Eric Hudson — Group Member
 Conor Murphy — Group Member
 Enrique Sampson — Group Member

Production and recording
 Matt Bayles — Mixing, Producer
 Fred Feldman — A&R
 Joe Lambert — Mastering
 Ryan Wasoba — Engineer
 Juuso Westerlund — Photography
 Teagan White — Artwork, Layout, Typography

Additional musicians
 Rachel Browne — Vocals
 Lizzie Costello — Vocals
 Nouela Johnston — Vocals
 Alex Rose — Saxophone
 Hans Teuber — Clarinet
 Emma Tiemann — Cello, Viola, Violin
 Jacob Whinihan — Percussion

Charting

References 
Citations

Sources

External links 
 

2015 albums
Foxing (band) albums
Triple Crown Records albums
Albums produced by Matt Bayles